Puteri Indonesia 2017, the 21st Puteri Indonesia pageant was held on March 31, 2017, at Jakarta Convention Center, Jakarta. Kezia Warouw, Puteri Indonesia 2016 of North Sulawesi crowned her successor Bunga Jelitha of Jakarta Special Capital Region 5 at the end of the event. All 38 contestants from 33 provinces competed for the crown.  The winner will represent Indonesia at the Miss Universe 2017, while the runners-up will compete at the Miss International 2017,  Miss Supranational 2017, and Miss Grand International 2017. Miss Universe 2016 Iris Mittenaere of France and Miss Grand International 2016 Ariska Putri Pertiwi of Indonesia attend at the Grand Final Show. Miss Universe 2005 Natalie Glebova of Canada also attended the show as a judge.

Kevin Liliana became the first Indonesian to win Miss International

Results

Main
The Crowns of Puteri Indonesia Title Holders
 Puteri Indonesia 2017 (Miss Universe Indonesia 2017) 
 Puteri Indonesia Lingkungan 2017 (Miss International Indonesia 2017)
 Puteri Indonesia Pariwisata 2017 (Miss Supranational Indonesia 2017)
 Puteri Indonesia Perdamaian 2017 (Miss Grand Indonesia 2017)

§ Voted into the Top 11 by viewers
θ Voted into the Top 6 by viewers

Order Announcements
 Bold: Winner of Puteri Indonesia
 Italic: 1st-3rd Runner Up

Top 11

 Jakarta SCR 2
 Papua
 Central Java
 Jambi
 West Java
 East Kalimantan
 East Nusa Tenggara
 South Sumatera
 West Sumatera
 Jakarta SCR 5
 North Sumatera §

Top 6 

 Jakarta SCR 5
 West Java
 East Nusa Tenggara
 Central Java
 Jambi
 North Sumatera θ

Top 4
announce after the show, declaring Miss Central Java as Miss Grand Indonesia
 Central Java

Top 3 

 West Java
 East Nusa Tenggara
 Jakarta SCR 5
Central Java was declared as 3rd Runner up (Miss Grand Indonesia)

Special Award

Puteri Indonesia Kepulauan
Favorite Contestant by votes on Instagram from each group Island:

Contestants
38 Contestants have been confirmed. The information from Puteri Indonesia Official website.

Crossovers
Contestants who previously experienced in model or beauty pageants:
North Sumatra: Putri Mentari Sitanggang won Miss UNPRI 2014.
South Sumatra: Nur Harisyah Pratiwi won Putri Sriwijaya 2015, Gadis Palembang 2014 and Bujang Gadis Kampus Sumsel 2013.
Bangka Belitung: Cut Nadia Dwi Ramadhani won Putri Pariwisata Bangka Belitung 2012 and awarded as Best Traditional Costume at the Putri Pariwisata Indonesia 2012.
Bengkulu: Intan Saumadina placed as the first runner-up Putri Pariwisata Bengkulu 2012.
Riau: Astari Aslam competed at Miss Indonesia 2011 represented Riau Islands
Jakarta Special Capital Region 1: Karina Nandia Saputri competed at Miss Indonesia 2013
Jakarta Special Capital Region 5: Bunga Jelitha Ibrani won the Supermodel International 2011 and Guess Girl Southeast Asia 2015.
Banten: Ratu Vashti Annisa won None Jakarta Selatan 2014.
East Java: Fatma Ayu Husnasari placed as the fourth runner-up Raki Jawa Timur 2015 and Diajeng Blitar 2014.
Bali: Devina Bertha placed as the second runner-up Cantik Indonesia Transtv 2015.
South Kalimantan: Suci Hastini won Best Catwalk Indonesia Top Model 2016. 
North Kalimantan: Fatya Ginanjarsari competed at Miss Indonesia 2011 represented Jakarta SCR (finished Top 5), the Face of Indonesia 2015 and Top 15 Guess Girl Indonesia 2015
West Sulawesi: Evelyne Yulyessia won Miss Model World Indonesia 2016.
Central Sulawesi: Monica Broksil won Putri Pariwisata Central Sulawesi 2015
Gorontalo: Nadhilah Dhina Shabrina competed at 2015 Miss Scuba International

Post-pageant notes
 Bunga Jelitha, Miss Universe Indonesia, competed in Miss Universe 2017 held on November 26, 2017, at The AXIS, Las Vegas, Nevada, United States.
 Kevin Lilliana, Miss International Indonesia, competed in Miss International 2017 held on November 14 at the Tokyo Dome City Hall in Tokyo, Japan where she was crowned Miss International 2017.
 Karina Nadila, Miss Supranational Indonesia, hailed among Top 25 at Miss Supranational 2017 during the finals held on December 1, 2017, at Krynica Zdroj, Poland.
 Dea Rizkita, Miss Grand Indonesia, hailed among Top 10 and won Best National Costume at Miss Grand International 2017 during the finals held on October 25 at Phu Quoc, Vietnam.

References

External links 

 Official Puteri Indonesia Official Website
 Official Miss Universe Official Website
 Miss International Official Website
 Official Miss Supranational Official Website

2017
Puteri Indonesia